Paul Williams (born 1950) is Emeritus Professor of Indian and Tibetan Philosophy at the University of Bristol, England. Until his retirement in 2011 he was also director for the University's Centre for Buddhist Studies, and is a former president of the UK Association for Buddhist Studies.

Biography
Williams studied at the University of Sussex's School of African & Asian Studies where he graduated with a first class BA in 1972. He then went on to study Buddhist Philosophy at Wadham College, University of Oxford, where he was awarded his DPhil in 1978.  His main research interests are Madhyamaka Buddhist philosophy, Mahayana Buddhism, and Medieval philosophical and mystical thought.

Williams was a Buddhist himself for many years but has since converted to Roman Catholicism, an experience he wrote about in his book The Unexpected Way and in an article, "On converting from Buddhism to Catholicism – One convert's story." He is now a professed lay member of the Dominican Order.

Williams married Sharon in 1971. They have three children: Myrddin, Tiernan and Tara, and several grandchildren and great grandchildren.

Select bibliography
Mahayana Buddhism: The Doctrinal Foundations (London: Routledge, 1989; Completely revised Second Edition, 2009). . Translations of First Edition in Italian, Polish and Korean.
The Reflexive Nature of Awareness: A Tibetan Madhyamaka Defence (Richmond: Curzon Press, 1998). 
Altruism and Reality: Studies in the Philosophy of the Bodhicaryavatara (Richmond: Curzon Press, 1998). 
 (with Anthony Tribe) Buddhist Thought: A Complete Introduction to the Indian Tradition (London: Routledge, 2000; completely revised Second Edition, with Anthony Tribe and Alexander Wynne, 2011). . Translations of First Edition in Italian, Korean and Czech.
The Unexpected Way: On Converting from Buddhism to Catholicism (London: Continuum/T & T Clark, 2002). . Translations in German and Polish.
Songs of Love, Poems of Sadness: The Erotic Verse of the 6th Dalai Lama (I.B. Tauris, 2004). 
Buddhism: Critical Concepts in Religious Studies Edited and with a new introduction by Paul Williams (London: Routledge, 2005). Eight volumes. 
Buddhism from a Catholic Perspective (London: Catholic Truth Society, 2006). 
'Catholicism and Buddhism', in The Catholic Church and the World Religions Edited by Gavin D'Costa (London: Continuum, 2011), pp. 141–177. 
Buddhist Funeral Cultures of Southeast Asia and China Edited by Paul Williams and Patrice Ladwig (Cambridge: Cambridge University Press, 2012).

References

External links
Paul Williams at University of Bristol Department of Theology and Religious Studies

Academics of the University of Bristol
Converts to Roman Catholicism from Buddhism
Lay Dominicans
English Roman Catholics
1950 births
Living people
British scholars of Buddhism